Edwin Styles (13 January 1899 – 20 December 1960) was a British stage comedian, pantomime actor, radio and TV performer and film actor.

Partial filmography
 Hell Below (1933) - Herbert Standish - Flight Comdr.
 On the Air (1934) - Edwin Styles
 Road House (1934) - Archie Hamble
 Patricia Gets Her Man (1937) - Brian Maxwell
 The Five Pound Man (1937) - Richard Fordyce
 Adam and Evelyne (1949) - Bill Murray
 The Lady with a Lamp (1951) - Mr. Nightingale
 Derby Day (1952) - Sir George Forbes
 Penny Princess (1952) - Chancellor - Cobbler
 Top Secret (1952) - Barworth Superintendent
 The Accused (1953) - Solicitor
 The Weak and the Wicked (1954) - Seymour
 For Better, for Worse (1954) - Anne's Boss
 Isn't Life Wonderful! (1954) - Bamboula
 The Dam Busters (1955) - Observer At Trials
 Up in the World (1956) - Conjuror
 The Full Treatment (1960) - Doctor Roberts
 Out of the Shadow (1961) - (final film role)

References

External links
 
 

1899 births
1960 deaths
English male stage actors
English male film actors
People from Chiswick
20th-century English male actors